Luke Myring (born 20 December 1983 in Leicester) is an English rugby union player. He usually plays at Fly-half  or Inside Centre. Myring was a product of the Leicester Tigers's academy, stepping up to play for the first team with Andy Goode, Ross Broadfoot and Ramiro Pez. Myring joined Northampton Saints to play first team rugby. While he played games for Saints, his game time at fly half was restricted by the presence of Carlos Spencer. He played much of his rugby for the Saints in the centres.
Luke left Northampton at the end of the 2006 - 2007 season.
In 2008 he signed for Italian Super 10 (now Top12) team AlmavivA Capitolina.

References

External links
 Capitolina profile
 profile at stats.com

1983 births
Living people
English rugby union players
Leicester Tigers players
Northampton Saints players
Alumni of Loughborough University
Rugby union fly-halves
English expatriate rugby union players
Expatriate rugby union players in Italy
English expatriate sportspeople in Italy
Rugby union players from Leicester